Uruguay competed at the 1928 Summer Olympics in Amsterdam, Netherlands.

Medalists

Results by event

Football

Squad
 José Andrade
 Juan Peregrino Anselmo
 Pedro Arispe
 Juan Arremón
 Venancio Bartibás
 Fausto Batignani
 René Borjas
 Antonio Campolo
 Adhemar Canavesi
 Héctor Castro
 Pedro Cea
 Lorenzo Fernández
 Roberto Figueroa
 Álvaro Gestido
 Andrés Mazali
 Ángel Melogno
 José Nasazzi
 Pedro Petrone
 Juan Piriz
 Héctor Scarone
 Domingo Tejera
 Santos Urdinarán

References
Montevideo.com

Nations at the 1928 Summer Olympics
1928
1928 in Uruguayan sport